Exchanged (Spanish: Intercambiadas) is a 2019 Peruvian fantasy comedy film directed by Daniel Vega and written by María José Osorio. It stars Patricia Portocarrero and Johanna San Miguel. It premiered on April 4, 2019, in Peruvian theaters.

Synopsis 
Little Vasco, Paola's son, makes a wish on a shooting star that will turn everything upside down: they both wake up in each other's bodies, giving rise to hilarious and funny situations while looking for a solution to their unique problem.

Cast 
The actors participating in this film are:

 Patricia Portocarrero as Guadalupe/Paola in her body
 Johanna San Miguel as Paola/Guadalupe in her body
 Matías Raygada as Vasco
 Bruno Odar as Ricardo
 Karime Scander as Chiara
 Bernardo Scerpella as David
 Guillermo Blanco as Mateo
 Liliana Trujillo as Charo

Production 
The filming of the film lasted three and a half weeks, in different locations in Lima such as a house in Barranco, Casino of the National Police of Peru, a house in San Martín square, San Luis school and buildings in downtown Lima.

Reception 
The film in its passage through theaters attracted 168,170 viewers

References

External links 

 

2019 films
2019 fantasy films
2019 comedy films
Peruvian fantasy comedy films
Tondero Producciones films
2010s Spanish-language films
2010s Peruvian films
Films set in Peru
Films shot in Peru
Body swapping in films
Films about families
Films about labor relations
Films about mother–son relationships
Films about mother–daughter relationships